Conrad of Piacenza, T.O.S.F. (1290 [or 1284]  – 19 February 1351), was an Italian penitent and hermit of the Third Order of St. Francis, who is venerated as a saint.

Biography

Early life

He was born Corrado Confalonieri, a member of one of the noblest families of Piacenza, in the town of Calendasco, a fiefdom of his family. The date of his birth is uncertain. He married an aristocratic young woman named Ephrosyne when he was quite young. Though pious, he led the normal way of life for a man of his station.
 
One day, as he was engaged in his usual pastime of hunting within his family's domain, he ordered his attendants to set fire to some brushwood in which game had taken refuge. The prevailing wind caused the flames to spread rapidly to the surrounding fields and forest. A peasant who happened to be found near where the fire began was accused of starting the blaze and was imprisoned, tortured to confess, and condemned to death. As the man was being led to execution, a remorseful Conrad publicly admitted his guilt to the Signoria of the city. As punishment and reparation for the damages he had caused, the city seized all his assets, only sparing his life due to his noble status.

Franciscan penitent
Thus reduced to poverty, and seeking penance for his act of cowardice, Conrad and his wife saw the hand of God in this event. As a result, in 1315 they agreed to separate and Conrad retired to a hermitage near the town of Calendasco, joining a community of hermits, who were Franciscan tertiaries, while his wife became a nun of the Order of Poor Clares at their monastery in the city.
 
Conrad soon developed a reputation for holiness, and the flow of visitors left him unable to keep the solitude he sought. He then embarked on the life of a pilgrim, going to Rome, and from there to the Holy Land and Malta and, about 1340, to Palermo in Sicily, where he was directed to an isolated site in the Val di Noto. After many years of an itinerant life, he settled there in a grotto now named for him and for the rest of his life spent a most austere and penitential life of solitude, working numerous miracles, and gifted with prophecy.

In 1343 Conrad felt called by God to serve the local people more directly and in 1343 went to the city of Netum, where he cared for the sick at the Hospital of St. Martin there for the next two years. He lived in a hermitage attached to the Church of the Crucified Christ occupied by the Blessed William Buccheri, a former equerry to King Frederick III of Sicily, who had also taken up a life of solitude and prayer. Conrad would regularly return to his grotto for silent prayer. His fame was such that in 1348 the Bishop of Syracuse, Giacomo Guidone de Franchis, went to his hermitage to beg his prayers for the relief of a famine afflicting the island.

Conrad died while in prayer, kneeling before a crucifix, on 19 February 1351, the day he had predicted. At his request, his body was buried at the Church of St. Nicholas, the principal one of the city. After the city was leveled in an earthquake in the 1690s, it was transferred to the new church of the same name built in the relocated city, now called Noto, which now serves as the cathedral of the region.

Veneration

Miracles
Conrad is especially invoked for the cure of hernia. This comes from miracles attributed to him. The legend relates that he was visited at his hermitage by a former friend and companion in arms, Antonio da Stessa, from Daverio. His friend was suffering from the pain of a hernia he had developed. Seeing the pain his old comrade was suffering, Conrad was moved to pity and prayed for him. Stessa was immediately cured of the hernia.

The same outcome was accomplished for a local tailor, who suffered severely from several hernias.

The miracle for which Conrad is best known is the "Miracle of the Bread". This developed during the aforementioned famine which afflicted Sicily as a result of a severe outbreak of the bubonic plague on the island during 1348–49. During that catastrophe, anyone who approached the hermit for help was given a loaf of bread, still warm, which, it was said, he had received from the angels.

Canonization

Shortly after Conrad's death, his demonstrably holy life and the large number of miracles attributed to him led the leadership of the city to request that the Bishop of Syracuse, to which diocese Noto belonged, begin the process for his canonization. When the waiting period required by Church law expired in 1485, this process was opened by Bishop Dalmazio Gabriele, O.P., who had himself witnessed the Miracle of the Bread. As part of the process, Conrad's body was exhumed for examination, and was found to be incorrupt, and placed in a silver urn for the veneration of the public.

Pope Leo X beatified Conrad on 12 July 1515 and permitted the town of Noto to celebrate his feast day. On 30 October 1544, Pope Paul III extended permission to the whole island. On 2 June 1625, he was canonized by Cardinal Odoardo Farnese, who was the Duke of Parma and Piacenza in a solemn ceremony at the cathedral of Piacenza, where it was declared an obligatory feast. On 12 September of that same year, permission was granted to the Franciscan Order by Pope Urban VIII for a distinct text for the Divine Office and Mass to be used for his feast; today it is celebrated solely by the Third Order of St. Francis to which he belonged. In Vietnam there is a popular devotion to Conrad.

On his feast day, the Parish Church of San Corrado in Noto commemorates him by the distribution of blessed bread.

See also

References

External links
Catholic Encyclopedia: "St. Conrad of Piacenza"
Saints.Spqn.com
Saint of the Day

1290 births
1351 deaths
People from the Province of Piacenza
Members of the Third Order of Saint Francis
Franciscan hermits
Italian hermits
Miracle workers
People from Noto
Burials in Sicily
Incorrupt saints
Italian Roman Catholic saints
Franciscan saints
13th-century Christian saints
14th-century Christian saints
Canonizations by Pope Urban VIII